Agyrta is a Neotropical genus of moth in the subfamily Arctiinae.

Species
 Agyrta albisparsa Hampson, 1898
 Agyrta bifasciata Rothschild, 1912
 Agyrta chena Druce, 1893
 Agyrta conspicua Schaus, 1911
 Agyrta dichotoma Draudt, 1931
 Agyrta dux Walker, 1854
 Agyrta flavitincta Hampson, 1898
 Agyrta garleppi Rothschild, 1912
 Agyrta grandimacula Zerny, 1931
 Agyrta klagesi Rothschild, 1912
 Agyrta macasia Schaus, 1924
 Agyrta mathani Rothschild, 1912
 Agyrta micilia Cramer, 1780
 Agyrta monoplaga Druce, 1898
 Agyrta pandemia Druce, 1893
 Agyrta porphyria Cramer, 1782
 Agyrta pulchriformis Rothschild, 1912
 Agyrta varuna Druce, 1907

Status unknown
 Agyrta lydia Druce

References
Natural History Museum Lepidoptera generic names catalog
Agyrta at Markku Savela's Lepidoptera and some other life forms

Arctiinae
Moth genera